Le Festif! is a three-day annual event held in Baie-Saint-Paul in the province of Quebec, in Canada. The event is held on the last weekend of July, one week before the opening of the Symposium of Contemporary Art. It takes its name from the French word "festif" meaning "festive". The event is described as a mix between popular musical and circus-arts.  In 2012, more than 10,000 people attended le festif!. The fourth addition in 2013 attendance was capped at 14,000.

Timeline of the event 

The statistics below illustrate the growth in attendance of the Le Festif! event, as well as other facts and figures.

References 

Culture of Quebec